Osinakachukwu Ideozu (born July 1965) is a Nigerian entrepreneur, businessman and politician. He was a member of the Senate of the Federal Republic of Nigeria were he represented the Rivers West Senatorial District. Ideozu had served as member and Minority Whip of the Rivers State House of Assembly from 1999 to 2003 where he represented Ahoada East Constituency 1 and also as a member of the Nigerian House of Representatives (2003 to 2007) where he represented Abua-Odual/Ahoada East Federal Constituency. Ideozu was the Rivers State Honourable Commissioner for Finance from 2007 to 2009.

Education
Senator Ideozu attended the then Rivers State University of Science and Technology (renamed Rivers State University) where he studied Estate Management at the Bachelors level (B.Tech) and graduated with a First Class. Ideozu holds a Master of Business Administration (MBA) Degree in Finance and Banking from the University of Port Harcourt. He also holds a masters degree (MSc) in Environmental Management from the Enugu State University of Science and Technology; another masters degree (MSc) in Public Policy from the University College London and a doctorate degree in Urban Infrastructure Development and Investment in Nigeria of the University of Vitez where he is a member of the professoriate and chair in Infrastructure Management. Senator Ideozu has also obtained an LLB (Hon) Law degree from the University of Law, Bloomsbury, London, UK. He has to his credit several academic laurels including the Dean's Prize for Best Graduating Student in the Faculty of Environmental Sciences (1989).

Professional career
Senator Ideozu is a Chartered Estate Surveyor and Valuer who is certified by the Estate Surveyors and Valuers Registration Board of Nigeria (ESVABON) and a Fellow of the Nigerian Institution of Estate Surveyors and Valuers (NIESV). Ideozu was the Overall Best Candidate in the 2004 Direct Finals Examination conducted by the Nigerian Institution of Estate Surveyors and Valuers (NIESV) where he was also the best candidate and winner of the subject prizes for both Property Development and Rating and Taxation. Senator Ideozu is also a Fellow of the Nigerian Institute of Management (Chartered) and Member of Social Policy Association (UK) and The Association for Public Policy Analysis and Management (USA) among others.

Career
Senator Ideozu is a statesman, a contented professional and an avid searcher of pragmatic knowledge. He is building on his business interests and consolidating on his training and knowledge of real estate and infrastructure development.

See also
List of people from Rivers State
List of University of Port Harcourt people

References

1965 births
Living people
Members of the Rivers State House of Assembly
Members of the House of Representatives (Nigeria) from Rivers State
Nigerian Christians
Rivers State Peoples Democratic Party politicians
University of Port Harcourt alumni
Businesspeople from Rivers State
Rivers State Commissioners of Finance
Members of the Senate (Nigeria) from Rivers State
Rivers State University alumni
Enugu State University of Science and Technology alumni
Alumni of University College London
Peoples Democratic Party members of the House of Representatives (Nigeria)
Peoples Democratic Party members of the Senate (Nigeria)
People from Ahoada East